Sidi Aoun is a town and commune in Magrane District, El Oued Province, Algeria. According to the 2008 census it has a population of 12,235, up from 10,018 in 1998, and an annual growth rate of 2.1%. Sidi Aoun is connected by local roads to Hassani Abdelkrim and Debila, two towns just north-east of El Oued.

Climate

Sidi Aoun has a hot desert climate (Köppen climate classification BWh), with very hot summers and mild winters. Rainfall is light and sporadic, and summers are particularly dry.

Education

5.4% of the population has a tertiary education, and another 12.5% has completed secondary education. The overall literacy rate is 75.6%, and is 65.9% among males and 55.8% among females.

Localities
The commune of Sidi Aoun is composed of four localities:

Sidi Aoun
Souihla
Ladhouaou
Djedeïda

References

Neighbouring towns and cities

Communes of El Oued Province
Cities in Algeria
Algeria